Calogero "Don Calò" Vizzini (24 July 1877 – 10 July 1954) was a Sicilian Mafia boss of Villalba in the Province of Caltanissetta, Sicily. Vizzini was considered to be one of the most influential and legendary Mafia bosses of Sicily after World War II until his death in 1954. In the media, he was often depicted as the "boss of bosses" – although such a position does not exist in the loose structure of Cosa Nostra.

He was the archetype of the paternalistic "man of honour" of a rural Mafia that disappeared in the 1960s and 1970s. In those days, a mafioso was seen by some as a social intermediary and a man standing for order and peace. In the first stage of his career, he used violence to establish his position, but in the second phase, he limited recourse to violence, turned to principally legal sources of income, and exercised his power in an open and legitimate manner.

Vizzini is the central character in the history of direct Mafia support for the Allied Forces during the invasion of Sicily in 1943. After World War II, he became the personification of the re-instatement of Cosa Nostra during the Allied occupation and the subsequent restoration of democracy after the repression under Fascist rule. Initially, he supported the separatist movement, but changed allegiance to the Christian Democrat party, when it became clear that Sicilian independence was unfeasible.

When he died in 1954, thousands of peasants dressed in black, and high-ranking mafiosi, politicians and priests took part in his funeral. The funeral epitaph stated that "his 'mafia' was not criminal, but stood for respect of the law, defense of all rights, greatness of character. It was love". However, Don Calò's rise to power and persistence in power was tied with extortion, violence and murder. Vizzini's stature as an all powerful Mafia boss rose to mythical proportions, but more recently historians have moderated his magnitude.

Early years in Villalba 

Vizzini was born in Villalba, a village in the Province of Caltanissetta, with a population of approximately 4,000 people at the time. This area in the middle of Sicily, known as the "Vallone", was a poor region where most people lived off subsistence agriculture. His father, Beniamino Vizzini, was a peasant, but managed to marry into a slightly more well-off family that owned some land. A member of his mother's family, Giuseppe Scarlata, had risen to high eminence in the Catholic Church. Calogero's brothers, Giovanni and Giuseppe (not to be confused with the bishop of Noto of the same name), both became priests in Villalba. Calogero Vizzini, however, was semi-literate and did not finish elementary school.

The Mafia of Villalba was of relatively recent origin, as it did not go back to the 1860s, considered to be the period when the Mafia emerged around Palermo. It started as a form of private protection and has little to do with large estates as was the case in many other rural areas where many mafiosi started as caretakers and lease-holders (gabelloto or bailiff) for absentee landlords.

In the 1890s, some people, including the young Calogero Vizzini, decided to do something about the absence of peace and security in the countryside. The state police at the time was as much a danger as the brigands. The Villalba Mafia thus emerged as an alternative social regime centred on the membership in church-sponsored associations that generated considerable social capital. It later transformed into a protection racket, victimizing villagers and landowners alike through violence, intimidation and omertà.

Don Calò once explained how he saw the Mafia when he was interviewed by one of Italy's most famous journalists, Indro Montanelli, for the Corriere della Sera (October 30, 1949):

At one time, Vizzini's criminal dossier included 39 murders, six attempted murders, 13 acts of private violence, 36 robberies, 37 thefts and 63 extortions.

Early career 
Vizzini became a cancia, an intermediary between the peasants who wanted their wheat milled into flour and the mills that were located near the coast. Mafiosi that did not tolerate any competition controlled the mills. In the case of Villalba, the mills were some 80 kilometres away. To get the grain safely to the mills over roads infested by bandits was no easy task.

He arranged protection with the bandit Francesco Paolo Varsallona, whose hide-out was in the Cammarata mountains. Varsallona, an alleged "man of honour", also supplied manpower to noble landowners to repress farmers' revolts. Vizzini enrolled in Varsallona's band while conducting his cancia business. Both were arrested in 1902 when Varsallona's band finally fell into a trap set up by the police. Vizzini stood trial with the rest of the band for "association to commit a crime" – but he was one of the few to be acquitted.

The episode had few negative consequences. In 1908, Vizzini was able to acquire a substantial part of the Belici estate when he brokered a deal between the owner, the duke Francesco Thomas de Barberin who resided in Paris, and the local rural bank Cassa Rurale, whose president, the priest Scarlata, was Vizzini's uncle. Vizzini held 290 hectares for himself and generously left the rest to the bank to lease out to Catholic peasants.

World War I and after 
By 1914, at the outbreak of World War I, Vizzini was the undisputed head of the Mafia in Villalba. The war provided the mafiosi with new opportunities for self-enrichment when the Italian Army requisitioned horses and mules in Sicily for the cavalry and artillery. Vizzini came to an agreement with the Army Commission to delegate the responsibilities to him. He collected a poll tax on the animals whose owners wanted to avoid requisition. He was also the broker for animals that were rustled for the occasion, buying at a low price from the rustlers and selling at market prices to the Army.

However, too many horses and mules died of diseases or old age before they even reached the battlefield and the army ordered an inquiry. In 1917, Vizzini was sentenced to 20 years in first instance for fraud, corruption and murder, but he was absolved thanks to powerful friends who exonerated him. He made his fortune on the black market during World War I, and expanded his activities to the sulphur mines. As a representative of a consortium of sulphur mine operators, Vizzini participated in high-level meetings in Rome and London concerning government subsidies and tariffs, next to such men as Guido Donegani of Montecatini chemical industries and Guido Jung, Finance minister during Benito Mussolini's fascist regime.

Don Calò further established his fortune in 1922 when he led disgruntled peasants who grabbed land from the aristocratic absentee landlords. Vizzini bought three estates in the Villalba region; he divided them up and handed them over – allegedly without making a penny, according to some – to a cooperative he had founded. According to a local villager, although every peasant got a plot, Don Calò kept more than 12,000 acres (49 km2) for himself.

At the time, according to German sociologist , Vizzini could easily have had himself elected as a parliamentary deputy. Nevertheless, he preferred to remain in the background and instead advise voters and elected officials, playing the role of benevolent benefactor, strengthening his clientele and prestige. He was present at a dinner in July 1922 with the future ruler of Italy, Benito Mussolini, in Milan and supported the March on Rome by Mussolini in October 1922, financing the column that marched from Sicily.

The authorities, however, had him listed as a dangerous criminal. A 1926 police report described Vizzini as a "dangerous cattle rustler, the Mafia boss of the province linked with cattle rustlers and Mafiosi of other provinces." With the rise of Mussolini and Fascist rule, Vizzini's fortunes changed. Mussolini did not tolerate a rival power on Sicily. He appointed Cesare Mori as the prefect of Palermo and granted special powers to persecute the Mafia. Vizzini claimed to have been incarcerated by Mori, but there are no historical records. Don Calò was tried and acquitted on 8 January 1931. However, the police decided to send him to the confinement in Basilicata. He returned to Villalba in 1937 and no one dared to persecute him anymore. Despite the confinement he was seen regularly in Villalba and Caltanissetta and not being blatantly fascist, he lived his life in peace.

Alleged support for allied invasion of Sicily 

In July 1943, Calogero Vizzini allegedly helped the American army during the invasion of Sicily during World War II (Operation Husky). In the US, the Office of Naval Intelligence (ONI) had recruited mafia support to protect the New York City waterfront from Axis Powers sabotage since the US had entered the war in December 1941. The ONI collaborated with Lucky Luciano and his partner Meyer Lansky, a Jewish mobster, in what was called Operation Underworld. The resulting Mafia contacts were also used by the US Office of Strategic Services (OSS) – the wartime predecessor of the Central Intelligence Agency (CIA) – during the invasion of Sicily. Later, the alliance was maintained in order to check the growing strength of the Italian Communist party on the island.

Popular myth has it that a US Army airplane had flown over Villalba on the day of the invasion and dropped a yellow silk foulard marked with a black L (indicating Luciano). Two days later, three American tanks rolled into Villalba after driving thirty miles through enemy territory. Don Calogero climbed aboard and spent the next six days traveling through western Sicily, organizing support for the advancing American troops. As General Patton's Third Division moved onward, the signs of its dependence on Mafia support were obvious to the local population. The Mafia protected the roads from snipers, arranged enthusiastic welcomes for the advancing troops, and provided guides through the confusing mountain terrain.

While mafiosi supported the US Army, recent research has led most serious historians to dismiss the legend of Luciano's foulard. Vizzini was unknown in other parts of Sicily at the time and had no overall power since prefect Mori's operations had disconnected the network of the Mafia. According to historian Salvatore Lupo:

Historian Tim Newark unraveled the myth in his book Mafia Allies. A version that is probably closer to the truth is that Vizzini simply led a delegation of locals to meet an Allied patrol whose commander had asked to speak to whoever was in charge. He quotes local historian, Luigi Lumia, who described how a procession of people with Calogero Vizzini at the helm made its way towards the tanks chanting: 'Long Live America', 'Long Live the Mafia', 'Long Live Don Calo'. Vizzini was taken to a command post outside Villalba and was interrogated about a recent firefight involving an American jeep on patrol. When Vizzini made it clear that the Italian soldiers had fled and the firefight had been caused by exploding ammunition, the frustrated US army official took his rage out in a stream of obscenities. Vizzini was utterly embarrassed by the incident and ordered his interpreter not to tell anybody what had happened.

Mayor of Villalba 
The Mafia only became credible again after the end of the invasion. The Allied Military Government of Occupied Territories (AMGOT), looking for anti-fascist notables to replace fascist authorities, made Don Calogero Vizzini mayor of Villalba, as well as an Honorary Colonel of the US Army. In the chaos that followed the invasion of Sicily and the collapse of Fascism, the American army often relied on senior churchmen for advice on whom to trust. Don Calò was one of those recommended. He had a long record of involvement with Catholic social funds and there were several clergymen in his family.

A witness at the time described the appointment of Vizzini: "When Don Calò Vizzini was made mayor of the town, almost the entire population was assembled in the square. Speaking in poor Italian, this American lieutenant said, 'This is your master'." According to Vizzini's own account, he was carried shoulder high through Villalba on the day that he took office as mayor. He claimed to have acted as a peacemaker; only his intervention saved his Fascist predecessor from being lynched.

Michele Pantaleone, who first reported the legend of Luciano's foulard, observed the Mafia's revival in his native village of Villalba. He described the consequences of AMGOT's policies:

The Americans authorities apparently appreciated Vizzini, because he had opposed the Fascists and yielded substantial political power on the island. As far as Vizzini was concerned, he liked to boast about his excellent contacts with the Americans, and underlined their support for the separatist movement. Vizzini would become an important player in the midst of the separatist crisis later on. The Americans seem to have treated Vizzini as the Mafia's overall boss. The OSS relied on the Mafia, and in particular on Vizzini, for its intelligence. His codename was ‘Bull Frog’ in secret communications. For a while, the chief of the OSS Palermo office, Joseph Russo, met him and other Mafia bosses ‘at least once a month’.

King of the black market 

Because of his excellent connections, Vizzini also became the 'king' of the rampant post-war black market and arranged to get Villalba's overly inquisitive police chief killed. AMGOT relied on mafiosi who were considered staunch anti-fascists because of the repression under Benito Mussolini. Many other mafiosi, such as Giuseppe Genco Russo, were appointed as mayors of their own hometowns. Coordinating the AMGOT effort was the former lieutenant-governor of New York, Colonel Charles Poletti, whom Luciano once described as "one of our good friends."

A peasant told the social activist Danilo Dolci in the 1950s how the situation was in Villalba after the Americans had landed: the Mafia "robbed the storehouses of the agrarian Co-op and the army’s storehouses; sold food, clothes, cars and lorries in Palermo on the black market. In Villalba, all power was in their hands: church, Mafia, agricultural banks, latifundia, all in the hands of the same family ... One used to go and see him and ask 'Can you do me this favour?' even for a little affair one had with some other person."'

Vizzini established one of the largest black market operations in southern Italy, together with the American gangster Vito Genovese, who had fled to Italy in 1937 after being accused of murder. Don Calogero sent truck caravans loaded with all the basic food commodities necessary for the Italian diet rolling northward to hungry Naples, where their cargoes were distributed by Genovese's organization. All of the trucks were issued passes and export papers by the AMGOT administration in Naples and Sicily, and some corrupt American army officers even made contributions of gasoline and trucks to the operation. According to Luke Monzelli, a lieutenant in the Carabinieri assigned to follow Genovese during his time in Italy: "Truckloads of food supplies were shipped from Vizzini to Genovese — all accompanied by the proper documents which had been certified by men in authority, Mafia members in the service of Vizzini and Genovese."

Supporting the separatists 
Vizzini initially supported the separatist movement in Sicily. On December 6, 1943, Vizzini participated at the first clandestine regional convention of the Sicilian separatists movement of the Sicilian Independence Movement (Movimento Indipendentista Siciliano - MIS) in Catania. Other prominent Mafia bosses like Giuseppe Genco Russo, Gaetano Filippone, Michele Navarra and Francesco Paolo Bontade did not hide their sympathies for the separatists either. The separatists benefited from covert support of the OSS. As Italy experienced a leftward drift in 1943–1944, the American military became increasingly concerned about their future prospects in Italy. The island's naval bases and strategic location in the Mediterranean provided a possible future counterbalance to a Communism on the Italian mainland. The Italian Communist Party's membership had doubled and the largely left inspired resistance movement in the north was gathering strength.

On 9 December 1943, the central committee of the separatist movement held a secret meeting in Palermo. Vizzini's presence suggested the Mafia's support for independence, and aided the conservative wing in their attempt to control the movement. Vizzini shared common views with baron Lucio Tasca – one of the more important leaders of the movement – and despite protests by the more progressive wing, Vizzini remained at the meeting representing the province of Caltanissetta.

Later, Vizzini represented the Fronte Democratico d'Ordine Siciliano, a satellite political organization of the separatist movement. The Fronte Democratico demonstrated the Mafia's hesitation to fully commit to the MIS. The Fronte was popular on the island and advocated independence of Sicily under American influence. Although the Americans strongly emphasized that the United States did not want Sicily as the 49th state, in late 1944, some claimed that the Fronte's ideas were the result of American propaganda that had encouraged separatism prior to the invasion. Fronte leaders spread rumours that they had the backing and protection of the United States. Many of its members were "lieutenants in the high Mafia" and Vizzini was considered its leader.

Declassified secret dispatches from the US consul in Palermo, Alfred T. Nester, to the United States Department of State show Vizzini's involvement in the separatist movement and covert support from Italian army officials. Nester had good ties with leading mafiosi. General Giuseppe Castellano – who negotiated the 1943 Armistice with Italy – and Vizzini met with Trapani politician  to offer him the leadership of a movement for Sicilian autonomy with the support of the Mafia. The plan was to stage Nasi as a candidate for High Commissioner for Sicily to oppose the favourite, the Christian Democrat Salvatore Aldisio.

Castellano became convinced that the Mafia was the strongest political and social force on Sicily to be reckoned with. He started to establish cordial relations with Mafia leaders. The general believed that law and order could be restored if "the system formerly employed by the old and respected Maf(f)ia should return to the Sicilian scene". Castellano made contacts with Mafia leaders and met with them several times. He gained the cooperation of Vizzini, who had supported separatism but was now prepared for a change in the island's political situation in the direction of regional autonomy.

Shifting to the Christian Democrats 
Most mafiosi soon changed sides, joining the Christian Democrat party (Democrazia Cristiana – DC) when it became clear that an independent Sicily was not feasible and the OSS quietly dropped support for the separatist movement in 1945 and turned to the DC. Bernardo Mattarella, one of the party's leaders, approached Vizzini to abandon the separatists and join the Christian Democrats. He welcomed Vizzini's joining the DC in an article in the Catholic newspaper  in 1945.

Vizzini offered to meet with Aldisio – who had been appointed High Commissioner in August 1944 – to solve the island's grain problem, implying he had the power to do so. There is no evidence that Aldisio and Vizzini ever met to discuss the issue. Aldiso did, however, invite , a fellow Christian Democrat and Mafia member befriended by Vizzini, to secret gatherings with Christian Democrats. The meetings were seen as a first step in a government alliance with the Mafia. Aldisio's appointment was perceived by Mafia chieftains as a first indication of the government's determination to subdue the separatist movement. They were now forced to reconsider their support.

Vizzini's support for the DC was not a secret. During the crucial 1948 elections that would decide on Italy's post-war future, Vizzini and Genco Russo sat at the same table with leading DC politicians, attending an electoral lunch. In the course of the start of the Cold War, the 1948 elections were a triumph for the Christian Democrats, who would govern Italy with up and downs for the next 45 years in different coalitions. One of its main aims was to keep the Italian Communist Party – the biggest communist party in a NATO member state – away from power.

Villalba incident 

Vizzini, a staunch anti-Communist who opposed the fight for land of Sicilian peasants, organised his own peasant cooperatives in his area during both post-war periods, through which he deflected the appeal of the left-wing parties, maintained his hold over the peasants, and guaranteed his own continued access to the land. He was in a fierce dispute over the lease of the large estate Miccichè of the Trabia family in Palermo, with a peasant cooperative headed by Michele Pantaleone who had founded the Italian Socialist Party (Partito Socialista Italiano – PSI) in Villalba. Vizzini had tried hard to persuade Pantaleone to marry his niece, but failed. Pantaleone used his leverage with the left wing press. In return, Don Calò arranged for the crops on Pantaleone family's land to be vandalized. There was even a failed attempt on Pantaleone's life.

On 16 September 1944, leaders of the Blocco del popolo (Popular Front) in Sicily, the communist Girolamo Li Causi and Pantaleone, went to speak to the landless labourers at a rally in Villalba, challenging Don Calò in his own personal fiefdom. In the morning, tensions rose when Christian Democrat mayor Beniamino Farina – a relative of Vizzini as well as his successor as mayor – angered local communists by ordering all hammer-and-sickle signs erased from buildings along the road on which Li Causi would travel into town. When his supporters protested, they were intimidated by separatists and thugs.

The rally began in late afternoon. Vizzini had agreed to permit the meeting as long as land problems, the large estates, or the Mafia were not addressed. Both speakers who preceded Li Causi, among which was Pantaleone, followed Vizzini's commands. Li Causi did not. He denounced the unjust exploitation by the Mafia, and when Li Causi started to talk about how the peasants were being deceived by ‘a powerful leaseholder’ – a thinly disguised reference to Vizzini – the Mafia boss hurled: It is a lie. Pandemonium broke out. The rally ended in a shoot-out which left 14 people wounded including Li Causi and Pantaleone. Six months later Vizzini acquired the lease for the Miccichè estate.

According to Vizzini's own account, La Verità sui Fatti di Villalba (The Truth About the Events in Villalba) that appeared in separatist newspapers, it had been the Communist who had started the shooting. When Pantaleone and Li Causi had arrived in the town, they asked Vizzini if they were in hostile territory and whether their meeting might be disturbed. Vizzini "assured them that they were free to hold their meeting without any fear of disturbance if they were careful enough not to speak on local matters". Vizzini admitted that he interrupted Li Causi, but denied that he had ignited the violence. The Carabinieri quickly restored order and arrested eight people, including the mayor. Several others, including Vizzini, evaded the police dragnet. Sixty persons were interrogated, but the investigation was doomed from the start. (Don Calò and his bodyguard were accused of attempted manslaughter. The trial dragged on until 1958, but by 1946 the evidence had already disappeared. Vizzini was never convicted because by the time of the verdict he was already dead.)

The Villalba attack inaugurated a long series of Mafia attacks in Sicily on political activists, trade union leaders and ordinary peasants resisting Mafia rule. In the following years, many left-wing leaders were killed or otherwise attacked, culminating in the killing of 11 people and the wounding of over thirty at a May 1 labour parade in Portella della Ginestra. The Portella della Ginestra massacre was attributed to the bandit and separatist leader Salvatore Giuliano. Nevertheless, the Mafia was suspected of involvement in the bloodbath and many other attacks on left-wing organisations and leaders.

Links to American gangsters 
In 1949, Vizzini and Italian-American crime boss Lucky Luciano set up a candy factory in Palermo exporting products all over Europe and to the US. Police suspected that it was a cover for heroin trafficking. The laboratory operated undisturbed until 11 April 1954, when the Roman daily Avanti! published a photograph of the factory under the headline "Textiles and Sweets on the Drug Route". That evening the factory was closed, and the laboratory's chemists were reportedly smuggled out of the country.

In 1950, Lucky Luciano was photographed in front of the Hotel Sole in the centre of old Palermo , frequently the residence of Don Calò Vizzini, talking with Don Calò's bodyguards. The photographer was beaten up, but he never reported the fact to the authorities after receiving an expensive new camera and cash. Vizzini's network reached the United States where he knew the future family boss Angelo Annaloro of Philadelphia, known as Angelo Bruno, who was born in Villalba.

Boss of bosses? 

In the media, Vizzini was often depicted as the "boss of bosses" – although such a position did not exist in the loose structure of Cosa Nostra, and later Mafia turncoats denied that he ever was the boss of the Mafia in Sicily. According to the pentito Tommaso Buscetta, the title capo dei capi or "boss of bosses" did not exist in Cosa Nostra. According to author John Dickie, "the question is if Vizzini was as dominant in the Mafia as he was famous outside it." In the matter of Mafia support for the separatist movement, other Cosa Nostra bosses sidelined Vizzini, who was considered to be tainted by his association with radical separatist leaders Andrea Finocchiaro Aprile and Lucio Tasca. These bosses wanted nothing to do with either the island's bandits or EVIS, to which Vizzini and Lucio Tasca were suspected to be connected. According to the pentito Antonio Calderone Vizzini never had been the boss of Cosa Nostra of Sicily.

Nevertheless, Vizzini wielded considerable power. The Italian journalist Luigi Barzini, who claimed to know Vizzini well, described his stature and daily life in Villalba in his book The Italians:

Vizzini's generous and protective manner, the deferential greetings of passers-by, the meekness of those approaching him, the smiles of gratefulness when he spoke to them, reminded Barzini of an primeval scene: a prince holding court and handing out justice publicly. However, Barzini also concluded, "[o]f course, the many victims of his reign were not visible, the many corpses found riddled with bullets in the countryside during more than half a century, the widows weeping, the fatherless orphans."

The former mayor of Villalba and local historian, Luigi Lumia, remembers Don Calò walking the streets of Villalba:

His power was not restricted to just his hometown, but reached the high offices on Sicily as well. According to Indro Montanelli, Vizzini could get through on the telephone without trouble to the regional president, the prefect, the cardinal-archbishop of Palermo and any deputy or mayor of Sicily any time he wanted. Lumia maintains that Vizzini never explicitly ordered someone to kill somebody.

Death 

Don Calò Vizzini died on 10 July 1954, at the age of 76, while entering Villalba in an ambulance that was transporting him home from a clinic in Palermo. Thousands of peasants dressed in black and politicians and priests took part in his funeral, including Mussomeli boss Giuseppe Genco Russo and the powerful boss Don Francesco Paolo Bontade from Palermo (the father of future Mafia boss Stefano Bontade) – who was one of the pallbearers. Even The New York Times reported the news of the death of this local Mafia chief.

Villalba's public offices and the Christian Democratic headquarters closed for a week in mourning. An elegy for Vizzini was pinned to the church door. It read:

 He left approximately two billion lire (about US$320,000 at the exchange rate at the time) worth of sulphur, land, houses and varied investments. According to other sources, he left a patrimony of a billion Italian lire (about US$160,000) to his grandsons, the sons of his sister, including sulphur mines in Gessolungo, land-holdings and a mansion in the centre of Villalba. Don Calò had remained unmarried after a love affair at the age of 20 with a local girl, Concettina. However, her parents lived in the United States and brought her over, and Vizzini did not want to leave his native Villalba.

Legacy 

Although Vizzini throughout his lifetime acquired extensive land-holdings, the Mafia historian Salvatore Lupo considers him to be the undertaker of the large feudal estates rather than the protector of that system. Vizzini did also make sure that local peasants (in particular the ones organised in Catholic cooperatives) got their share of land, once he had secured his cut. When land-reform was finally enacted in 1950, mafiosi like Vizzini were in a position to perform their traditional role of brokerage between the peasants, the landlords, and the state. They were able to exploit the intense land-hunger of the peasants, gain concessions from the landlords in return for limiting the impact of the reform, and make substantial profits from their mediation in land sales.

Don Calò Vizzini was the archetype of the paternalistic "man of honour" of a bygone age, that of a rural and semi-feudal Sicily that existed until the 1960s, where a mafioso was seen by some as a social intermediary and a man standing for order and peace. In the first stage of his career, he used violence to establish his position, but in the second phase, he limited recourse to violence, turned to principally legal sources of income, and exercised his power in an open and legitimate manner.

He represented a Mafia that controlled power and did not let power control them, according to German sociologist Henner Hess. To make a good impression, or fare figura, is important: "they enjoy the respect shown them, they enjoy power, but they do not wish to give rise to its discussion. They know very well that behind the veil of modesty, power is felt to be all the more uncanny." Italian journalist Indro Montanelli quoted a typical remark by Don Calò:

"When I die, the Mafia dies", Vizzini did once tell Montanelli. However, with the death of Vizzini, his old-fashioned traditional rural Mafia slowly passed away to be replaced with a more modern, often urban version of gangsterism involved in cigarette smuggling, drug trafficking and laundering their proceeds in construction and real-estate development. While still alive, and after his death, Vizzini's stature as an all powerful Mafia boss rose to mythical proportions. Since the 1990s, historians have moderated his magnitude.

References 
Notes

Sources
Arlacchi, Pino (1988). Mafia Business. The Mafia ethic and the spirit of capitalism, Oxford: Oxford University Press 
 Arlacchi, Pino (1992). Gli uomini del disonore. La mafia siciliana nella vita del grande pentito Antonino Calderone, Milan: Mondadori  (Reprint Il Saggiatore, 2010)
 Arlacchi, Pino (1994). Addio Cosa nostra: La vita di Tommaso Buscetta, Milan: Rizzoli 
 Badolati, Arcangelo & Stefano Dodaro (1985). Il Mammasantissima. La strage di Villalba e il processo calabrese a Calogero Vizzini, Cosenza: Pellegrini Editore, 
Barzini, Luigi (1964/1968). The Italians, London: Penguin Books  (originally published in 1964)
 Caruso, Alfio (2000). Da cosa nasce cosa. Storia della mafia del 1943 a oggi, Milan: Longanesi 
Chubb, Judith (1989). The Mafia and Politics, Cornell Studies in International Affairs, Occasional Papers No. 23.
Dickie, John (2004). Cosa Nostra. A history of the Sicilian Mafia, London: Coronet, 
Finkelstein, Monte S. (1998). Separatism, the Allies and the Mafia: The Struggle for Sicilian Independence, 1943-1948, Bethlehem (Pennsylvania): Lehigh University Press 
Hess, Henner (1998). Mafia & Mafiosi: Origin, Power, and Myth, London: Hurst & Co Publishers,  (Review)
Jamieson, Alison (2000). The Antimafia: Italy’s fight against organized crime, London: Macmillan, .
Lewis, Norman (1964/2003). The Honoured Society: The Sicilian Mafia Observed, London: Eland, 
Lupo, Salvatore (2009). History of the Mafia, New York: Columbia University Press, 
 Manica, Giustina (2010). Mafia e politica tra fascismo e postfascismo: Realtà siciliana e collegamenti internazionali 1924-1948, Manduria-Bari-Roma: Piero Lacaita Editore 
McCoy, Alfred W. (1972/1991), The Politics of Heroin in Southeast Asia. CIA complicity in the global drug trade, Lawrence Hill Books 
Newark, Tim (2007/2012). The Mafia at War: Allied Collusion with the Mob, London: Greenhill Books,  (Review)
Paoli, Letizia (2003). Mafia Brotherhoods: Organized Crime, Italian Style, Oxford/New York: Oxford University Press 
Sabetti, Filippo (1984/2002). Village Politics and the Mafia in Sicily, Montreal: McGill-Queens University Press 2002 (First published in 1984 as Political Authority in a Sicilian Village, New Brunswick (NJ): Rutgers University Press) (Review)
Servadio, Gaia (1976), Mafioso. A history of the Mafia from its origins to the present day, London: Secker & Warburg 
Sterling, Claire (1990). Octopus. How the long reach of the Sicilian Mafia controls the global narcotics trade, New York: Simon & Schuster,

External links 
The Honored Society, Norman Lewis, The New Yorker, February 8, 1964
Die Ehrenwerte Gesellschaft, Norman Lewis, Der Spiegel 52/1964 vom December 23, 1964 
 Quel giorno al "Des Palmes" incontrai Don Calogero, by Indro Montanelli, Corriere della Sera, September 27, 1995 

1877 births
1954 deaths
People from Villalba, Sicily
Italian anti-communists
Sicilian mafiosi
Italian crime bosses
Allied invasion of Sicily
Capo dei capi
Gangsters from the Province of Caltanissetta